This list of museums in Wisconsin encompasses museums defined for this context as institutions (including nonprofit organizations, government entities, and private businesses) that collect and care for objects of cultural, artistic, scientific, or historical interest and make their collections or related exhibits available for public viewing. Also included are non-profit and university art galleries. Museums that exist only in cyberspace (i.e., virtual museums) are not included.

Museums

Defunct museums
 American UFO and Sci-Fi Museum, Wisconsin Dells
 Artasia Gallery & Museum, Milwaukee
 Carl's Wood Art Museum, Eagle River, Roadside America report
 Chudnow Museum of Yesteryear in Milwaukee, closed December 2020, bulk of artifacts transferred to Cedarburg History Museum
 Fairfield Art Center, Sturgeon Bay(Story on closure)
 Fort Bon Secours, Cadott
 The Hideout - Al Capone's Northwoods Retreat, Couderay
 Kickapoo Indian Caverns, Wauzeka, included a Native American museum
 Little Norway, Wisconsin, Blue Mounds, closed in 2012
 Madison Museum of Bathroom Tissue
 Museum of Norman Rockwell Art, Reedsburg, Reedsburg information about museum
 Rudy Rotter's Museum of Sculpture, Manitowoc
 Swarthout Museum, La Crosse, formerly operated by the La Crosse County Historical Society
 Thunderbird Museum, Merrilan, Roadside America - closed report
 Watson's Wild West Museum, Old west general store with American West artifacts, closed November 2018
 William F. Eisner Museum of Advertising & Design, Milwaukee, closed in 2010

Regions defined
The Wisconsin Department of Natural Resources (WDNR) has defined five tourism regions of Wisconsin as follows below:

Central Sands Prairie Region
Counties in the central area:  Adams, Calumet, Clark, Fond du Lac,  Green Lake, Juneau, Marathon, Marquette, Menominee, Monroe, Outagamie, Portage, Shawano, Waupaca, Waushara, Winnebago, Wood

Lake Michigan Region
Counties in the eastern area along Lake Michigan, including the Door Peninsula:  Brown, Door, Kenosha, Kewaunee,  Manitowoc, Marinette, Marathon, Marquette, Menominee, Milwaukee, Oconto, Ozaukee, Racine, Sheboygan

Lake Superior Northwoods Region
Counties in the north central and northwest area:  Ashland, Barron, Bayfield, Burnett,  Douglas, Florence, Forest, Iron, Langlade, Lincoln, Oneida, Polk, Price, Rusk, Sawyer, Taylor, Vilas, Washburn

Mississippi/Chippewa Rivers Region
South central and southwest area along the Mississippi and Chippewa rivers: Buffalo, Chippewa, Crawford, Dunn,  Eau Claire, Grant, Jackson, La Crosse, Pepin, Pierce, St. Croix, Trempealeau, Vernon

Southern Savanna Region
South central area: Columbia, Dane, Dodge, Green,  Iowa, Jefferson, Lafayette, Richland, Rock, Sauk, Walworth, Washington, Waukesha

See also
 Nature Centers in Wisconsin
 Observatories in Wisconsin (category)

References

External links

Directory of Wisconsin Local Historical Organizations
Wisconsin Federation of Museums
Wisconsin Arts Board
Portal Wisconsin

Museums
Wisconsin
Museums